Azela is a village in the Boumerdès Province in Kabylie, Algeria.

Location
The village is surrounded by Meraldene River and the town of Thenia in the Khachna mountain range.

Notable people

Boualem Boukacem (born 1957), Algerian artist.
Mohamed Hassaïne (1945-1994), Algerian journalist.

References

Villages in Algeria
Boumerdès Province
Kabylie